Periodic elections for the Tasmanian Legislative Council were held on 2 May 2009. The three seats up for election were Derwent, held by Labor MLC Michael Aird; Mersey, held by retiring independent MLC Norma Jamieson; and Windermere, held by independent MLC Ivan Dean. These seats were last contested in 2003.

Derwent
Derwent had been held by Michael Aird for Labor since a 1995 by-election; he had previously served in the House of Assembly from 1979 to 1986 and from 1989 to 1995. A minister in Michael Field's government from 1989 to 1992, he had served as Treasurer and Minister for Racing since 2006. The Tasmanian Greens endorsed Susan Gunter, a shearer and former environmental lawyer. Independent candidate Jenny Branch, Glenorchy Alderman and President of the Tasmanian Parents and Friends Association, was a Liberal Party member but resigned from the party prior to the election.

The former federal member for Franklin, Harry Quick, initially nominated as a Greens candidate, but he withdrew his nomination.

Since Aird won a majority on the first vote, no preference count was conducted.

Mersey
Independent MLC for Mersey Norma Jamieson decided to retire after one term, having been first elected in 2003. Four candidates, all independents, contested the election. Mike Gaffney was a teacher and public servant who had been Mayor of Latrobe Council since 2002 and President of the Tasmanian Local Government Association since 2006. Although running as an independent, Gaffney had previously run for the Labor Party at the 2002 state election and received some support from the Labor government. Norma Jamieson's daughter Carolynn was a small business owner. Lynn Laycock had been Mayor of Devonport since 2005; she had some Liberal connections, having worked as an assistant to Liberal Premier Tony Rundle. Steve Martin was running primarily on the issue of Mersey Community Hospital, which had passed to Commonwealth control the previous year. He had previously worked for Labor MPs and was a restaurateur at the time of the election.

Windermere
Independent MLC for Windermere Ivan Dean had first been elected in 2003, when he defeated independent Labor member Silvia Smith. In 2005 he was elected as Mayor of Launceston, which attracted some criticism for holding the dual positions; Dean opted to donate his mayoral salary to charity. He lost the mayoralty in 2008 but remained a councillor; his defeat was reckoned to have something to do with his support for the Gunns pulp mill. His highest-profile challenger was Kathryn Hay, who served as Labor MHA for Bass from 2002 to 2006. Hay was running as an independent Labor candidate. The Tasmanian Greens endorsed small business owner and maritime scientist Peter Whish-Wilson. Independent Peter Kaye was a prominent local radio presenter campaigning mainly on increasing funding for Launceston General Hospital. Launceston councillor and former Labor Party member Ted Sands was also standing as an independent.

References

2009 elections in Australia
Elections in Tasmania
2000s in Tasmania
May 2009 events in Australia